

Storms
Note:  indicates the name was retired after that usage in the respective basin

Rachel
 1984 – stayed out at sea.
 1990 – made landfall on the southern tip of Baja California Sur and northwestern Mexico; killed 18.
 1997 – made landfall in western Australia.
 1999 – made landfall in Taiwan as a tropical depression.
 2014 – stayed out at sea.

Rae
1980 – a weak tropical cyclone that affected Vanuatu.
1990 – a Category 2 tropical cyclone that affected a few South Pacific islands, killing 3 people.
2005 – a weak tropical cyclone that did not affect any landmasses.

Rai
2016 – a weak tropical system that affected Vietnam.
2021 – a powerful Category 5-equivalent super typhoon that caused severe and widespread damage in the Southern Philippines.

Rafael (2012) – a Category 1 hurricane that affected a few islands in the Caribbean.

Ramil
 2009 – powerful Category 5 super typhoon that formed northwest of Kwajalein, and recurved off Luzon, becoming extratropical northeast of Japan.
 2013 – Category 4 typhoon, which struck the Ryukyu Islands and Japan.
 2017 – a Category 2 typhoon that impacted Vietnam and Cambodia.

Rammasun
2002 – a Category 3 typhoon that affected the Ryukyu Islands and Korea; also contributed to flooding in the Philippines.
2008 – a Category 4 typhoon that stayed out at sea.
2014 – a Category 5 super typhoon that impacted both the Philippines and South China, causing billions in damages.

Ramon
 1987 – a Category 4 major hurricane that remained at sea but generated torrential rains over Southern California.
 2011 – a weak tropical storm that affected the Philippines.
 2017 – a weak and short-lived tropical storm that stayed off the coast of southern Mexico.
 2019 – a minimal typhoon that impacted northern Philippines.

Ramona
 1967 - long-lived tropical storm that did not affect land.
 1971 - did not affect any land areas.

Rananim (2002) – a Category 2 typhoon that impacted East China, causing damages of up to US$2.4 billion.

Raquel (2015) – the first tropical cyclone to exist within the South Pacific Ocean during the month of July on record; affected the Solomon Islands.

Rashmi (2008) – a weak and short-lived tropical cyclone that impacted Bangladesh, killing 28 people.

Ray (1975) – an early-season Australian severe tropical cyclone.

Raymond
 1983 – tied with Hurricane Kiko for the strongest tropical cyclone of the 1983 Pacific hurricane season.
 1989 – the strongest tropical cyclone of the 1989 Pacific hurricane season.
 2005 – a Category 1 tropical cyclone that made landfall on the northern coast of Australia.
 2013 – the strongest tropical cyclone of the 2013 Pacific hurricane season.
 2019 – short-lived tropical storm which dissipated without affecting land.

Rebecca
 1961 – stayed out at sea.
 1968 – a Category 1 hurricane that passed off the coast of Mexico.
 1985 – made landfall in Queensland as a Category 1 storm.

Rebekah (2019) – a subtropical storm that only persisted in the central Atlantic Ocean.

Reming
 1964 – not areas land.
 1968 – a Category 1 typhoon that hit the Philippines and slightly sunk South Vietnam.
 1972 – no ares land.
 1976 – produced tremendous rainfall in Japan including, at the time, a national 24-hour record accumulation of 1,140 mm (44.8 in).
 1980 – hit Taiwan.
 1984 – one of the most intense tropical cyclones on record and the strongest storm of the 1984 season.
 1988 – a weak tropical storm that hit the Philippines.
 1992 – recurved away from land. 
 1996 – hit Philippines, Abel killed eight people, left seven others missing and caused $4.3 million.
 2000  – killed 181 people in the Philippines and Taiwan.
 2006 – an intense typhoon that killed at least 734 people in the Philippines and 98 people in Vietnam.

Rena (1949) – a November tropical storm that affected the Philippines.

Rene
 2010 – a Category 3 severe tropical cyclone that caused significant damage in Tonga and American Samoa. 
 2020 – weak storm that formed east of Cape Verde and then moved out to sea, earliest seventeenth named storm in the Atlantic basin.

Rening (1999) – a weak system that impacted Vietnam bringing torrential rainfall.

Reuben (2015) – a weak tropical cyclone that brought heavy flooding in parts of Fiji.

Rewa
1983 – a severe tropical cyclone that remained far out in sea.
1993 – a Category 5 tropical cyclone and a system that lasted for 28-days.

Rex (1998) – a Category 4 typhoon that stayed out at sea off Japan.

Rhonda
1986 – affected Perth bringing heavy rain.
1997 – a May Category 4 severe tropical cyclone that later affected Western Australia.

Richard (2010) – a late-October Category 2 hurricane that impacted Central America.

Rick
 1985 – strong category 4 hurricane, never a threat to land
 1996 – minimal storm that stayed away from land
 1997 – weak category 2 hurricane, made landfall in Mexico during November
 2009 – powerful category 5 hurricane, one of the strongest to form during October and the third-most intense Pacific hurricane on record
 2015 – weak tropical storm, never threatened land
 2021 – strong category 2 hurricane, made landfall near Lázaro Cárdenas, Michoacán.

Riley (2019) – a Category 3 severe tropical cyclone, causing minimal impacts in Northwestern Australia.

Rina
 2011 – a powerful but small Category 3 hurricane that made landfall in the Yucatán Peninsula. 
 2017 – a tropical storm that formed in the Central Atlantic.

Rita
 1948 
 1953 - hit China as a tropical storm
 1958 - affected the Micronesian Islands; mostly stayed out at sea
 1961 - stayed largely at sea with minor damage in Palau and the Mariana Islands
 1963 - affected the Philippines, stayed out at sea
 1964
 1966 - stayed out at sea
 1969 - short-lived system that stayed out at sea
 1971 - caused flooding to Western Australia
 1972 – the longest lasting Western Pacific tropical cyclone.
 1975 – affected Japan and the Ryūkyū Islands.
 1978 – one of the most intense tropical cyclones ever recorded, caused much damage in the Philippines.
 2001 – a Category 1 tropical cyclone that remained far out in sea.
 2005 – powerful Category 5 hurricane that caused extensive damage to Texas and Louisiana.
 2019 – a November Category 3 severe tropical cyclone that affected the Solomon Islands.

Ritang (1994) – a Category 5 super typhoon that affected East China and Taiwan.

Roanu (2016) – a May tropical storm that affected Bangladesh and Sri Lanka.

Robert (1977) – a severe tropical cyclone that caused minor impacts in several South Pacific islands.

Robyn
1975 – traversed much of the Indian Ocean.
1990 – a long-living tropical storm that caused minor impacts.
1993 – a Category 4 typhoon that affected Japan.
2010 – a tropical cyclone that stayed out in the central Indian Ocean.

Roger
1979 – a weak and disorganised tropical storm in the Western Pacific.
1982 – a December severe tropical storm that brushed the coast of eastern Philippines.
1986 – a Category 2 typhoon that brushed the southern coast of Japan.
1993 – a tropical cyclone that affected New Caledonia.

Roke
 2005 – a Category 1 storm that struck the Philippines in March 2005.
 2011 – a Category 4 storm that struck Japan in September 2011.
 2017 – made landfall in Hong Kong as a tropical depression.
 2022 - a minimal typhoon that did not threaten any land areas.

Rolf (2011) – an unusual Mediterranean tropical storm that brought flooding to Italy, France, Spain, and Switzerland in November 2011.

Rolly
1989 – a severe tropical storm that impacted Japan, bringing torrential rainfall.
2004 – a Category 5 typhoon that impacted Japan.
2008 – affected the Philippines as a tropical depression
2020 – a Category 5 super typhoon that devastated the Philippines.

Ron (1998) – the strongest tropical cyclone on record to impact Tonga.

Rona (1999) – throated Queensland as a minimal tropical cyclone, but later re-developed into Cyclone Frank.

Rosa
1978 — threatened Baja California.
1979 — struck northern Australia.
1982 — brushed southwestern Mexico.
1994 — A Category 2 hurricane that killed at least 4 people in Mexico and widespread flooding in the U.S. state of Texas that killed 22 people and caused hundreds of millions of dollars in damage in October 1994. 
2000 – made landfall in Mexico as a weak tropical storm, causing minimal damage.
2006 – never threatened land.
2012 – never threatened land.
2018 – widespread flooding to northwestern Mexico and the Southwestern United States in late September 2018, and was the first tropical cyclone to make landfall in Baja California since Nora in 1997.

 Rosal (2022) – remained out at sea.

Rosalie
 1970 – not areas land.
 1974 – not areas land.

Rosalind (1947) – the first super typhoon ever recorded in the Northwest Pacific.

Rose
 1948 – a Category 1 typhoon that hit the Philippines and South China.
 1952 – a Category 1 typhoon that passed off the coast of Japan.
 1957 – a powerful Category 4 typhoon that did not make landfall.
 1960 – a weak tropical storm that was in the open sea.
 1963 – approached the Philippines and struck Japan.
 1965 (April) – passed west of Réunion.
 1965 (August) – approached the Philippines and struck China.
 1968 – struck the Philippines and Vietnam.
 1971 – struck the Philippines and China.
 1974 – approached Ryūkyū Islands.
 1978 – struck Taiwan.
 2021 – a rather weak tropical storm that stayed at sea.

Rosie
1971 – made landfall as a Category 1 tropical cyclone.
1997 – a Category 5 July super typhoon that affected Japan.
2008 – a Category 2 tropical cyclone that affected Christmas Island.

Rosing
 1963– became a Category 4-equivalent super typhoon but did not affect any land areas.
 1967 – struck the Philippines.
 1971 – struck the Philippines and China.
 1975 – one of the most intense tropical cyclones on record, reaching 875 millibars.
 1979 – a Category 3 typhoon that struck Japan and caused 12 deaths.
 1983 – struck the Philippines and China.
 1987 – struck the Philippines and Vietnam.
 1991 – struck Japan and became the country's costliest typhoon ever.
 1995 – a strong Category 5-equivalent typhoon that caused 882 fatalities and severe damage across the Philippines.

Rosita
1990 – stayed out at sea.
2000 – an intense tropical cyclone that impacted Western Australia.
2018 – was an extremely powerful tropical cyclone that caused catastrophic destruction on the islands of Tinian and Saipan in the Northern Mariana Islands, and later impacted the Philippines.

Roskas (2003) – a Category 3 typhoon that did not affect any land.

Roslyn
 1964 – caused no damage or fatalities. 
 1986 – made landfall near Manzanillo.
 1992 – developed in the open ocean, causing no damage or deaths.
 2016 – weak tropical storm that never threatened land.
 2022 – a Category 4 hurricane which struck the Mexican state of Nayarit.

Roxanne (1995) – a rare and erratic Category 3 hurricane that caused extensive flooding in Mexico.

Roy
1981 – churned over the South China Sea.
1984 – a weak tropical storm that affected the Mariana Islands.
1988 – the second-most intense January Pacific typhoon on record; caused widespread damage on Guam and Rota.

Ruby
1950 – a category 3 typhoon that passed off the coast of Japan.
1954 – hit the Philippines as a typhoon, and hit China as a tropical storm.
1959 – did not affect any major land masses.
1961 – tropical storm that hit the Philippines and Vietnam.
1964 – struck near Hong Kong.
1967 – tropical storm that had little effect on the Philippines.
1970 – tropical storm that affected the Philippines and China.
1972 – not a threat to land
1976 – struck the Philippines and approached Japan.
1982 – not areas land. 
1985 – struck Japan.
1988 – affected the Philippines and Hainan Island.
2014 – struck the Philippines
2021 – a strong tropical cyclone that impacted New Caledonia with strong winds and rainfall, after its predecessor tropical low and a nearby trough caused disruption over some parts of the Solomon Islands.

Rumbia
 2000 – impacted the Philippines.
 2006 – a tropical storm in the Pacific that did not make landfall.
 2013 – struck the Philippines, Hong Kong, and Macau.
 2018 – a weak but costly tropical storm that struck China.

Ruping
1966 – affected Japan as a severe tropical storm.
1970 – a minor tropical depression.
1974 – affected Taiwan as a severe tropical storm.
1978 – affected southwestern Japan as a minimal typhoon.
1982 – a Category 2 typhoon that impacted the Philippines and South China.
1986 – a tropical storm that affected the Philippines and Vietnam.
1990 – a catastrophic typhoon that devastated the Philippines, killing more than 700 people.

Rusa (2002) – mainly affected the Korean Peninsula, bringing damages of up to US$4 billion.

Russ
1990 – a Category 4 typhoon that affected Micronesia and Guam.
1994 – affected South China bringing torrential rainfall which caused billions of damages.

Rusty (2013) – a Category 4 severe tropical cyclone that produced record duration gale-force winds in Port Hedland, Western Australia in late February 2013.

Ruth
 1945 – struck Japan
 1951 – Category 4 typhoon, struck Japan killing 572 people and injuring another 2,644
 1955 – Category 5 super typhoon, churned in the open ocean
 1959 – far northeast of the Philippines
 1962 – Category 5-equivalent super typhoon, remained east of Japan
 1965 – remained out at sea
 1967 – Category 3-equivalent typhoon, remained east of Japan
 1970 – passed just south of Cape Cà Mau; also known as Aning within the PAR
 1973 – Category 2-equivalent typhoon, crossed Luzon, Philippines, then hit Hainan Island, China and then Northeast Vietnam; also known as Narsing within the PAR
 1977 – hit China; also known as Kuring within the PAR
February 1980 – remained east of Queensland
 September 1980 – crossed Hainan Island before hitting northern Vietnam
 1983 – dissipated east of the Philippines due to strong wind shear; also known as Ading within the PAR
 1987 – caused severe damage in South China
 1991 – Category 5 super typhoon, made landfall on northern Luzon with winds of 115 mph (185 km/h); also known as Trining within the PAR
 1994 – short-lived storm, east of Japan

Ryan (1992) – a Category 4 typhoon that passed eastern Japan.

See also

European windstorm names
Atlantic hurricane season
List of Pacific hurricane seasons
Tropical cyclone naming
South Atlantic tropical cyclone
Tropical cyclone

References
General

 
 
 
 
 
 
 
 
 
 
 
 
 
 
 
 
 

 
 
 
 
 

R